The 1998 San Marino local elections were held on 13 December to elect the mayors and the councils of Acquaviva, Borgo Maggiore, Faetano, Fiorentino and Serravalle in San Marino. Overall turnout was 64.0%.

Electoral system
Voters elected the mayor (Italian: capitano di castello) and the municipal council (giunta di castello). The number of seats was determined by law: the city councils of Acquaviva, Faetano and Fiorentino were composed of eight members; the councils of Borgo Maggiore and Serravalle were composed of 10 members.

Candidates ran on lists led by a mayoral candidate. Voters elected a list and were allowed to give up to two preferential votes. Seats were allocated with the d'Hondt method if the winner had obtained at least 60% of the votes. Otherwise, six seats would have been allocated to the winning party (five seats where the council was composed of eight seats) and the rest of the seats would have been allocated using the d'Hondt method to the rest of the parties. The winning list mayoral candidate was proclaimed mayor.

In the municipalities where only one list contested the election, the election was considered valid if the turnout was over 50% and the votes to the list were over 50% of the valid votes (votes to the list plus blank votes).

Results

Acquaviva

Borgo Maggiore

Faetano

Fiorentino

Serravalle

References

External links
 Election results
 Elections in San Marino

1998
San Marino
Local election